The 2003 Milton Keynes Council election took place on 1 May 2003 to elect members of Milton Keynes Unitary Council in Buckinghamshire, England. One third of the council was up for election and the Liberal Democrats stayed in overall control of the council.

After the election, the composition of the council was:
Liberal Democrat 27
Labour 16
Conservative 7
Independent 1

Election result

Ward results

References

2003 English local elections
2003
2000s in Buckinghamshire